Eat Na Ta! was a Philippine television variety show broadcast by GMA Cebu. The show's initial broadcast was on November 12, 2007 as a daily game show on DYSS Super Radyo Cebu, and later evolved into a live TV program aired on GMA Cebu as a pre-programming for Eat Bulaga!.

Hosts
 Bobby Nalzaro†
 Choopetah
 Cutie del Mar
 Papa Joe
 Cerj Michael a.k.a. Undoy Z

Segments
 Itaktak Gyud
 Ang Akong Pangandoy
 BobBest Nalzaro
 Kurata Uy
 Kwarta Na Ni

References

GMA Network original programming
Philippine variety television shows
2007 Philippine television series debuts
2008 Philippine television series endings
Eat Bulaga!
Television series by TAPE Inc.
Television in Cebu City